Great Lakes League may refer to:

Great Lakes League, Current Northeast Ohio high school ice hockey conference
Great Lakes League, Defunct Northwest Ohio high school all-sports conference